Okenia is a genus of colorful sea slugs, specifically of dorid nudibranchs, marine gastropod mollusks in the family Goniodorididae.

Species
Species within the genus Okenia include:

 Okenia academica Camacho-Garcia & Gosliner, 2004
 Okenia africana Edmunds, 2009
 Okenia ameliae Ortea, Moro & Caballer, 2014
 Okenia amoenula (Bergh, 1907)
 Okenia angelensis Lance, 1966
 Okenia angelica Gosliner & Bertsch, 2004
 Okenia ascidicola M.P. Morse, 1972
 Okenia aspersa (Alder & Hancock, 1845)
 Okenia atkinsonorum Rudman, 2007
 Okenia aurorapapillata Paz-Sedano & Pola in Paz-Sedano, Wilson, Carmona, Gosliner & Pola, 2021
 Okenia barnardi Baba, 1937
 Okenia brunneomaculata  Gosliner, 2004
 Okenia cochimi Gosliner & Bertsch, 2004
 Okenia cupella (Vogel & Schultz, 1970)
 Okenia digitata (Edmunds, 1966)
 Okenia distincta Baba, 1940
 Okenia echinata Baba, 1949
 Okenia elegans (Leuckart, 1828) - type species
 Okenia elisae Paz-Sedano & Pola in Paz-Sedano, Wilson, Carmona, Gosliner & Pola, 2021
 Okenia eolida (Quoy & Gaimard, 1832) 
 Okenia evelinae Er. Marcus, 1957
 Okenia felis Gosliner, 2010
 Okenia ghanensis Edmunds, 2009
 Okenia hallucigenia Rudman, 2004
 Okenia harastii Pola, Roldán & Padilla, 2014
 Okenia hiroi (Baba, 1938)
 Okenia hispanica Valdes & Ortea, 1995
 Okenia impexa Er. Marcus, 1957
 Okenia japonica Baba, 1949
 Okenia kendi Gosliner, 2004
 Okenia kondoi (Hamatani, 2001) - originally described as Sakishimaia kondoi Hamatani, 2001
 Okenia lambat Gosliner, 2004
 Okenia leachii (Alder & Hancock, 1854)
 Okenia liklik Gosliner, 2004
 Okenia longiductis Pola, Paz-Sedano, Macali, Minchin, Marchini, Vitale, Licchelli & Crocetta, 2019
 Okenia luna Millen, Schrödl, Vargas, & Indacochea, 1994
 Okenia mediterranea (Ihering, 1886)
 Okenia mellita Rudman, 2004
 Okenia mexicorum Gosliner & Bertsch, 2004
 Okenia mica Ortea & Moro, 2014
 Okenia mija Burn, 1967
 Okenia miramarae Ortea & Espinosa, 2000
 Okenia nakamotoensis (Hamatani, 2001)
 Okenia nakanoae Paz-Sedano & Pola in Paz-Sedano, Wilson, Carmona, Gosliner & Pola, 2021
 Okenia opuntia Baba, 1960
 Okenia pellucida Burn, 1967
 Okenia picoensis Paz-Sedano, Ortigosa & Pola, 2017
 Okenia pilosa (Bouchet & Ortea, 1983)
 Okenia plana Baba, 1960
 Okenia polycerelloides (Ortea & Bouchet, 1983)
 Okenia problematica Pola, Paz-Sedano, Macali, Minchin, Marchini, Vitale, Licchelli & Crocetta, 2019
 Okenia pulchella Alder & Hancock, 1854
 Okenia purpurata Rudman, 2004
 Okenia purpureolineata Gosliner, 2004
 Okenia rhinorma Rudman, 2007
 Okenia rosacea (MacFarland, 1905)
 Okenia sapelona Ev. Marcus & Er. Marcus, 1967
 Okenia siderata Paz-Sedano & Pola in Paz-Sedano, Wilson, Carmona, Gosliner & Pola, 2021
 Okenia stellata Rudman, 2004
 Okenia tenuifibrata Paz-Sedano & Pola in Paz-Sedano, Wilson, Carmona, Gosliner & Pola, 2021
 Okenia vancouverensis (O'Donoghue, 1921)
 Okenia vena Rudman, 2004
 Okenia virginiae Gosliner, 2004
 Okenia zoobotryon (Smallwood, 1910)

Nomen dubium
 Okenia pusilla Sordi, 1974 
Species names considered to be synonyms
 Okenia dautzenbergi Vayssière, 1919: synonym of Okenia aspersa (Alder & Hancock, 1845)
 Okenia modesta (A. E. Verrill, 1875): synonym of Okenia aspersa (Alder & Hancock, 1845)
 Okenia quadricornis (Montagu, 1815): synonym of Okenia aspersa (Alder & Hancock, 1845)

References

 Leuckart F. S. (1828). Breves animalium quorundum maxima ex parte marinorum descriptiones. Heidelberg pp. 24:
 Bergh, L. S. R. 1881. Ueber die Gattung Idalia, Leuckart. Archiv für Naturgeschichte 47(1):140-181, pls. 6-8
 Odhner N.J. 1941. New polycerid nudibranchiate mollusca and remarks on this family. Göteborgs Kungl. Vetenskaps- och Vitterhets-Samhälles Handlingar, Ser. B, Matematiska och Naturvetenskapliga Skrifter, 1(11): 1-20
 Edmunds, M. (1966). Teshia digitata gen. and sp. nov., a dorid nudibranch from Ghana. Journal of the malacological Society of London. 37: 69-72
 Gofas, S.; Le Renard, J.; Bouchet, P. (2001). Mollusca. in: Costello, M.J. et al. (Ed.) (2001). European register of marine species: a check-list of the marine species in Europe and a bibliography of guides to their identification. Collection Patrimoines Naturels. 50: pp. 180–213.
 Hamatani I. (2001) Two new species of Goniodorididae (Opisthobranchia; Nudibranchia) with a new genus from Kuroshima Island, Okinawa, Japan. Venus, 60(3): 151-156

Further reading 
 Behrens David W., 1980, ‘’Pacific Coast Nudibranchs: a guide to the opisthobranchs of the northeastern Pacific’’, Sea Challenger Books, California
 http://www.catalogueoflife.org accessed 25 August 2009

External links 

Goniodorididae
Gastropod genera